İZBAN is a commuter rail system serving İzmir, Turkey. It has forty-one stations.

Stations

Future stations

References 

IZBAN
Stations